Gaston Tremblay (April 16, 1924 – July 11, 1998) was a politician in Quebec, Canada and a Member of the Legislative Assembly of Quebec (MLA).

Background

He was born in Quebec City on April 16, 1924 and became a physician.

Mayor

Tremblay served as Mayor of Beauport, Quebec from 1961 to 1970.

Member of the legislature

He unsuccessfully ran as a Union Nationale candidate in the 1962 election in the provincial district of Quebec County.  Tremblay was elected to the Legislative Assembly of Quebec in the 1966 election and represented the district of Montmorency.

He crossed the floor on October 30, 1968 to sit as an Independent.  He then joined the Parti nationaliste chrétien, and then in 1969, he joined the Ralliement créditiste and became its first sitting member in the provincial legislature.

Tremblay ran as a Ralliement créditiste candidate and was defeated in the 1970 and 1973 elections.

Electoral history 

In Montmorency (provincial electoral district)

References

See also
 History of Quebec

1924 births
1998 deaths
Mayors of places in Quebec
Politicians from Quebec City
Ralliement créditiste du Québec MNAs
Union Nationale (Quebec) MNAs
Université Laval alumni